Dowlatabad (also Romanized as Dowlatābād) is a village in Cheghapur Rural District, Kaki District, Dashti County, Bushehr Province, Iran. At the 2006 census, its population was 60, in 13 families.

References 

Populated places in Dashti County